Alice Cheung is an American biochemist who is a Professor of Molecular Biology at the University of Massachusetts Amherst. Her research considers the molecular and cellular biology of polarization. She was elected a Fellow of the American Association for the Advancement of Science in 2020.

Early life and education 
Cheung was born in Hong Kong. Her parents decided that she and her brother would attend university in the United States, and Cheung moved to Smith College to complete her undergraduate studies. She moved to Yale University for her graduate studies, where she focused on molecular biophysics. Her doctoral research considered the genetic and biochemical regulation of aminoacyl tRNA synthetase. At a scientific conference, she heard Eugene Nester discussing the cell interaction between agrobacteria and plants, which inspired her to learn more about plant biology. After completing her doctoral research, Cheung joined Harvard University as a postdoctoral fellow, learning more about chloroplast-nuclear interactions, and reading the work of Adrienne Clarke and June Nash on Nicotiana tabacum. Inspired by this work, and the work of Elizabeth Lord, Cheung decided to investigate plant reproduction.

Research and career 
Cheung was recruited to the faculty at Yale University in 1987. She was promoted to Associate Professor in 1993, before joining the University of Massachusetts Amherst at a full Professor of Biochemistry. There she started working in cell biology. Her research considers the role of signalling strategies in plants, with a particular focus on the communication between pollen and pistil, which ultimately leads to fertilisation. She showed that FERONIA is an essential aspect of the wall-to-cell communication process.

Awards and honors 
 1991 Yale University Junior Faculty Fellowship
 2010 Fellow of the American Society of Plant Biologists Award
 2014 University of Massachusetts Amherst Distinguished Faculty Lecturer and Recipient of Chancellor's Medal
 2018 University of Massachusetts Amherst Samuel F. Conti Faculty Fellowship Award
 2020 American Society of Plant Biologists Lawrence Bogorad Award for Excellence in Plant Biology Research
 2020 Elected a Fellow of the American Association for the Advancement of Science
 Recognized as a Pioneer Member of the American Society of Plant Biologists.

Selected publications

References 

21st-century American women scientists
Living people
Year of birth missing (living people)
Smith College alumni
Yale College alumni
Yale Faculty of Arts and Sciences
Amherst College faculty
American biochemists
Fellows of the American Academy of Arts and Sciences
American women botanists
American botanists
American women academics